The 1976 Minnesota Golden Gophers football team was an American football team that represented the University of Minnesota in the 1976 Big Ten Conference football season. In their fifth year under head coach Cal Stoll, the Golden Gophers compiled a 6–5 record (4–4 against conference opponents), finished in a four-way tie for third place in the Big Ten Standings, and were outscored by their opponents by a combined total of 211 to 201.
 
Quarterback Tony Dungy received the team's most valuable player award for the second consecutive year. Strong safety George Adzick was named All-Big Ten first team.  Dungy, wide receiver Ron Kullas and defensive lineman George Washington were named All-Big Ten second team. Dungy, offensive lineman Brien Harvey, fullback Kent Kitzmann and cornerback Bob Weber were named Academic All-Big Ten. Terry Matula was named Offensive Lineman of the Year. Jim Perkins was the Big Ten's third leading scorer with 78 points on 13 rushing touchdowns.

Home attendance for the season was 257,878, which averaged to 42,979. The season high for attendance was against rival Iowa. 1976 was the last season of Tartan Turf at Memorial Stadium.

Schedule

Roster

References

Minnesota
Minnesota Golden Gophers football seasons
Minnesota Golden Gophers football